Robert R. Baxley (born March 14, 1969) is a former American football offensive tackle who played one season with the Phoenix Cardinals of the National Football League. He was drafted by the Phoenix Cardinals in the eleventh round of the 1992 NFL Draft. He played college football at the University of Iowa and attended Oswego High School in Oswego, Illinois. Baxley was also a member of the Amsterdam Admirals and Tampa Bay Buccaneers.

College career
Baxley played college football for the Iowa Hawkeyes, starting three seasons at right tackle. He earned All-Big Ten and honorable mention All-American honors his senior year.

Professional career

Phoenix Cardinals
Baxley was selected by the Phoenix Cardinals with the 286th pick in the 1992 NFL Draft. He was a member of the Cardinals from 1992 to 1993, playing in six games for the team in 1992. He spent the 1993 season on the injured reserve list.

Amsterdam Admirals
Baxley was selected by the Amsterdam Admirals of the World League of American Football in the twelfth round of the 1995 WLAF Draft and played for them during the 1995 season.

Tampa Bay Buccaneers
Baxley signed with the Tampa Bay Buccaneers on June 23, 1995. He was released by the Buccaneers on August 21, 1995.

References

External links
Just Sports Stats
College stats

Living people
1969 births
Players of American football from Illinois
American football offensive tackles
Iowa Hawkeyes football players
Phoenix Cardinals players
Amsterdam Admirals players
People from Oswego, Illinois